Intercontinental is an album by jazz guitarist Joe Pass that was released in 1970. The album is a collection of mainly swing and Latin jazz standards with the exception of the country/pop hit "Ode to Billie Joe". It features drummer Kenny Clare and bassist Eberhard Weber. This album is notable as a rare example of Eberhard Weber playing straight ahead bass on covers of standards.

Track listing
 "Chlo-e" (Gus Kahn, Neil Moret) – 5:24
 "Meditation" (Antônio Carlos Jobim, Newton Mendonça, Norman Gimbel) – 5:25
 "I Cover the Waterfront" (Johnny Green, Edward Heyman) – 4:15
 "I Love You" (Cole Porter)
 "Stompin' at the Savoy" (Benny Goodman, Andy Razaf, Edgar Sampson, Chick Webb) – 4:15
 "Watch What Happens" (Michel Legrand) – 5:25
 "Joe's Blues" (Joe Pass) – 6:00
 "El Gento" (Willi Fruth) – 4:03
 "Ode to Billie Joe" (Bobbie Gentry) – 3:30
 "Lil' Darlin'" (Neal Hefti) – 3:45

Personnel
Joe Pass – guitar
Eberhard Weber – bass
Kenny Clare – drums

References

External links
Joe Pass Memorial Hall

1970 albums
Joe Pass albums
MPS Records albums
Bebop albums